This is a list of neighborhoods and districts in Pensacola, Florida.

Pensacola is divided into 16 separate districts and almost 100 separate neighborhoods.

Downtown Pensacola(1)
Downtown Pensacola
Historic Pensacola Village
Historic Pensacola Village
Port Royal
Tanyard
Belmont Devilliers
Westside Garden District

Baymarc(13)
Neighbors of Seville
Aragon
Court St.Joe
Seville Bayfront
Carlton Palms
Old East Hill
East Hill

Cervello(7)
Cervello

Truman Court
Park Place
Britton Place

Renz-anna Villa(11)
Renz-anna Villa

Sunny Ridge(2)
Roosevelt
Devera Hills
Gary Park
Fiveash
West Highlands
Welles Brownsville (Brownsville)
Walter Court
Emerald Arms
Benson Court

Goulding(6)
Englewood Heights
North Highlands
North Hill
Highlands
Lakeview

East Downtown(16)
Pinecrest
Brainard Mcintyre
Highlands Park
Hazlehurst

Woodland Heights(4)
Camelia Court
Blandford Place
Brookside
Duvon Heights
Mac Pensacola
Elite Plaza
Cordova Collections
Gloria Estates
El Cerrito Place
Douglas Square
Cordova Park
Inverness
Cordova Farms
Cordova Bluffs
Texar Land
Cordova Estates
Birnam Woods
Windermere

Eastmount(5)
Bilek Manor
King George Estates
Carriage Hills
Villages at Marcus Lake
Montclair
Wildewood
Oak Park
Chanley Street Place
Rosewood Terrace

Brittany Forge(15)
Brittany Forge
Victoria Ation
Dover Landing
Riddick Estates
Wentonia Estates
Enchanting Oaks
Hampton Court
Ynche Clyffe
La Chateau
Sotogrande Villas

La Mirage(8)
Bay Village
Woodcliff
La Mirage
Ironwood
Bay Oak Villas
Bay Oaks
D'evereux
Scenic Bluffs

Briggs Manor(10)
Burgess Court
Grove
Cordova West
Briggs Manor
To College Court
Woodlore
Reeces
Fontana

Kensington(14)
Kensington
East Gate
Spanish Trace

Regency Park(12)
Regency Park
Eastwood
Baybrook
Heritage Oaks
Ramsgate
Baybrook Unit
Grandpointe

Walden(3)
Walden
Plantation Park

External links

Neighborhoods in Florida
Pensacola, Florida
Pensacola